Lanela is a village located in the district of Jaisalmer in the state of Rajasthan in India. It has a population of about 1049 persons living in around 194 households.

History
Lanela is a Paliwal village, about 1000 years old. The word "Lanela" means "Lavanya Illa" which means "The Land with Beauty".

Geological survey of Lanela
Ammonites Study of the Jurassic Rocks of Jaisalmer basin, Rajasthan. A research Project to evaluate ammonite fauna from the Jurassic rocks of Jaisalmer district was taken up during F.S. 1996‐98 under Palaeontology Division of western region, Jaipur. Intensive field works were carried out in the area around Jaisalmer to study different litho‐packages and collect ammonite fauna to establish biozonation. The marine Jurassic succession of Jaisalmer basin has been classified into three distinct formations namely Jaisalmer, Baisakhi and Bedesar Formations in ascending order of antiquity. These are underlain by non‐marine sequence of Lathi Formation which has been dated as Liassic to Bathonian by Das Gupta (1975) and as Liassic by Lukose (1972).

The calcareous Jaisalmer Formation is followed upward sequence by siliciclastic sediments of Baisakhi formation. The Baisakhi Formation in general, comprises shale, sandstone, siltstone and ironstone and is subdivided into Rupsi, Lodorva and lanella members in ascending order by Prasad (2006). The Rupsi and Lanella Members of the Formation contain profuse ammonites and can be dated as Early kimmeridgian to Late Kimmeridgian in age. The middle Lodorva Member is unfossiliferous.

Geography and climate

The area is sandy from one side, other side barren land, one side fertile Khadins are there and one side salt water lake is situated.

Digitally processed satellite images have unearthed the hidden course of a major lost river below the sands of the Thar Desert, in the India–Pakistan (Indo-Pak) region. The great Himalayan river of the Vedic period (10 000–8000 BP) is mentioned in ancient Indian literature. It was called the ‘Saraswati’ in India and the ‘Hakra’ in Pakistan and it dried up during 4000–3500 BP. Large numbers of archaeological sites from the Harappan civilization occur along the dry river bed. The mapped course of the river is 4–10 km wide and conforms to the size described in the Rigveda. The newly described course is validated through the drilling of tube wells in the channels and through archaeological, hydrogeological and sedimentary data. An enormous quantity of potable water has been found along these channels. The path of the (main) river course, the likelihood of the river shift and the reasons for its disappearance are discussed. One path traced out as below mentioned-
Bahla–Ratund– Mohangarh–Lanela–Dawa–Devran–Giral–Kanod–Gadra road.(A. K. Guptaa, J. R. Sharmab & G. Sreenivasanc pages 5197-5216,Using satellite imagery to reveal the course of an extinct river below the Thar Desert in the Indo-Pak region, International Journal of Remote Sensing, volume 32, issue 18, 2011)

Soil and Land
The Indian Thar Desert comprises about 70% part of the western Rajasthan incorporating 8 saline districts processing salt lakes and salt basins, in them Jaisalmer (Lanela and Pokhran) is one of them

Akashvani relay centre
A strong FM waves radio relay centre situated at Lanela.

References

 Premsingh, et al., International Indexed & Referred Research Journal, August 2012, ISSN 0975-3486, RNI-RAJBAL 2009/30097:VoL III*ISSUE-35

Jaisalmer